Dilā (Nepal Bhasa: 𑐡𑐶𑐮𑐵, दिला) is the ninth month in the Nepal Era calendar, the national lunar calendar of Nepal. The month coincides with Āsāṛh (आषाढ) in the Hindu lunar calendar and July in the Gregorian calendar.

Dilā begins with the new moon and the full moon falls on the 15th of the lunar month. The month is divided into the bright and dark fortnights which are known as Dilā Thwa (दिला थ्व) and Dilā Gā (दिला गा) respectively.

Among the major events of the month, the 11th day of the bright fortnight is Hari Sayani Ekādashi which marks the beginning of the Hindu deity Vishnu's four-month cosmic sleep. On the 12th day, devotees plant the Tulsi plant (Holy basil) in their homes. The plant represents Vishnu.

The full moon day is Guru Purnimā when teachers are honored. The holiday is also known as Dilā Punhi and is sacred to Buddhists as the day when the Buddha gave his first sermon and set in motion the Dharmacakra, the Wheel of Dharma. The first day of the dark fortnight is the start of Vassa, the three-month rains retreat for Buddhist monks when they remain in their monasteries.

The festival of Gathān Mugah Charhe (गथां मुगः चह्रे) is celebrated on the 14th day of the dark fortnight when evil spirits are chased out of the city limits.

Days in the month

Months of the year

References

Months
Nepali calendar
Nepalese culture